Beyond Therapy Records was an American industrial music record label founded by Ben V of Ludovico Technique in 2010. The label signed primarily underground bands of the industrial, electronic body music, and related genres. It was based in Orlando, Florida. The label's roster included Preacher, Cryogen Second, and MyParasites.

Dissolution
In 2016 the label's entire roster was removed from Bandcamp and all references to the label disappeared from the web. Some releases still exist on iTunes and Spotify. Founder Ben V has not made any statement regarding the fate of the label. Many of its former roster artists have since disbanded or moved on to other record labels.

Former Beyond Therapy Records Artists
9th Evolution
Acid Casualty
Cryogen Second
DespondentMassAtrophy
Finite Automata
Force.Is.Machine
MyParasites
Preacher
Professor Grim
Deprived
Prognosis
Man Woman Machine
Ghostfeeder

See also 
 List of record labels

References

External links
 Official site
 Official Myspace page
 Official Facebook page

Defunct record labels of the United States
Record labels established in 2010
Record labels disestablished in 2016
Industrial record labels
Electronic music record labels
Companies based in Orlando, Florida
Defunct companies based in Florida